The Firing Line is a lost 1919 American silent drama film directed by Charles Maigne and starring Irene Castle. It was based on the 1908 novel by Robert W. Chambers and produced by Famous Players-Lasky. Paramount Pictures distributed the film.

Cast
Irene Castle as Sheila Cardross
Isabel West as Mrs. Cardross
May Kitson as Constance Paliser
Anne Cornwall as Cecile Cardross
Gladys Coburn as Jessie Bradley
Vernon Steele as John Garrett "Garry" Hamil III (credited as R. Vernon Steele)
David Powell as Louis Malcourt
J. H. Gilmore as Neville Cardross
Frank Losee as James Wayward
Rudolph de Cordova as One of the Faithful Three
Charles Craig as One of Faithful Three
Philip S. Rice as One of Faithful Three
Robert Schable as William Portlaw
Jane Warrington as Virginia Suydam
Shaw Lovett as Gary Cardross

References

External links

1919 films
American silent feature films
Lost American films
Films directed by Charles Maigne
Paramount Pictures films
Films based on American novels
Films based on works by Robert W. Chambers
1919 drama films
American black-and-white films
Silent American drama films
1919 lost films
Lost drama films
1910s American films